Bayantu'men (Rich tumen), also Tsagaanders is a sum (district) of Dornod Province in eastern Mongolia. Name "Bayantu'men" was in use for Choibalsan city (before 1941), the railway station and mine in the NE outskirts of Choibalsan city have name of Bayantu'men also. In 2009, its population was 2,006.

References 

Districts of Dornod Province